Kid gloves may refer to:

Clothing 
Gloves made from kidskin, leather from young goats

Music 
Kid Gloves, a British production duo consisting of Roy Kerr and Anu Pillai
Kid Gloves, a 1992 album by Larry Carlton
"Kid Gloves", by Doomtree from the 2008 album Doomtree
"Kid Gloves", by Fountains of Wayne from the 2005 album Out-of-State Plates
"Kid Gloves", by Marmaduke Duke from the 2009 album Duke Pandemonium
"Kid Gloves", by Rory Gallagher from the 1990 album Fresh Evidence
"Kid Gloves", by Rush from the 1984 album Grace Under Pressure
"Kid Gloves", by Surkin from the 2008 Next of Kin EP
"Kid Gloves", by Voxtrot from the 2007 album Voxtrot
Metaphor used in "Leif Erikson" from Interpol's 2002 debut album Turn On the Bright Lights

Film 
Kid Gloves (film), a 1929 film with Richard Cramer
Kid Glove Killer, a 1942 crime film starring Van Heflin

Other 
 Kid Gloves (video game)